Radcliffe is a city in Hardin County, Iowa, United States. The population was 555 at the time of the 2020 census.

History
Radcliffe was laid out in 1880 when the railroad was extended to that point. It was named after the novel The Heir of Redclyffe by Charlotte Mary Yonge.

Geography
Radcliffe is located at  (42.314662, -93.432259).

Demographics

2010 census
As of the census of 2010, there were 545 people, 243 households, and 157 families living in the city. The racial makeup of the city was 96.1% White, 0.2% Native American, 3.5% from other races, and 0.2% from two or more races. Hispanic or Latino of any race were 5.7% of the population.

There were 243 households, of which 28.0% had children under the age of 18 living with them, 56.4% were married couples living together, 3.7% had a female householder with no husband present, 4.5% had a male householder with no wife present, and 35.4% were non-families. 32.5% of all households were made up of individuals, and 20.1% had someone living alone who was 65 years of age or older. The average household size was 2.24 and the average family size was 2.83.

The median age in the city was 43.5 years. 23.9% of residents were under the age of 18; 4% were between the ages of 18 and 24; 23.1% were from 25 to 44; 26.1% were from 45 to 64; and 22.9% were 65 years of age or older. The gender makeup of the city was 48.8% male and 51.2% female.

2000 census
As of the census of 2000, there were 607 people, 252 households, and 165 families living in the city. The racial makeup of the city was 96.38% White, 2.47% from other races, and 1.15% from two or more races. Hispanic or Latino of any race were 4.45% of the population.

There were 252 households, out of which 31.3% had children under the age of 18 living with them, 58.3% were married couples living together, 5.6% had a female householder with no husband present, and 34.5% were non-families. 31.0% of all households were made up of individuals, and 19.0% had someone living alone who was 65 years of age or older. The average household size was 2.41 and the average family size was 3.04.

25.9% were under the age of 18, 7.6% from 18 to 24, 27.5% from 25 to 44, 14.5% from 45 to 64, and 24.5% were 65 years of age or older. The median age was 38 years. For every 100 females, there were 91.5 males. For every 100 females age 18 and over, there were 91.5 males.

The median income for a household in the city was $39,417, and the median income for a family was $46,875. Males had a median income of $33,056 versus $22,188 for females. The per capita income for the city was $18,729. None of the families and 1.1% of the population were living below the poverty line, including no under eighteens and none of those over 64.

Education
Hubbard–Radcliffe Community School District is the area school district. The district formed on July 1, 1993, with the merger of the Hubbard and Radcliffe school districts. , it has a grade-sharing arrangement with Eldora–New Providence Community School District and operates as "South Hardin Schools".

References

Cities in Hardin County, Iowa
Cities in Iowa
1880 establishments in Iowa